Chloropaschia rufibasis is a species of snout moth in the genus Chloropaschia. It is found in Trinidad, Costa Rica and Peru.

References

Moths described in 1910
Epipaschiinae